Hye-sung, also spelled as Hye-seong, or in North Korea as Hye-song,  is a Korean unisex given name. Its meaning differs based on the hanja used to write each syllable of the name. There are 16 hanja with the reading "hye" and 27 hanja with the reading "sung" on the South Korean government's official list of hanja which may be registered for use in given names.

People with this name include:
Hwang Hye-seong (1920–2006), South Korean female researcher of Korean royal court cuisine
Han Hye-song, North Korean table tennis player
Shin Hye-sung (born 1979), South Korean male singer, member of boyband Shinhwa
Kim Hye-song (boxer) (born 1984), North Korean female boxer
Hyun Hye-sung (born 1986), South Korean male field hockey player
Kim Hye-seong (born 1988), South Korean male actor
Jung Hye-sung (born Jung Eun-joo, 1991), South Korean actress
Kim Hye-song (runner) (born 1993), North Korean female runner
Kim Hye-song (gymnast) (born 1997), North Korean female gymnast
Hyeseong (singer) (born Yang Hye-sun, 1999), South Korean female singer, member of girl group Elris

Fictional characters with this name include:
Jang Hye-sung, female character in 2013 South Korean television series I Can Hear Your Voice
Joo Hye-sung, male character in 2016 South Korean television series Hey Ghost, Let's Fight.
Nam Hye-sung, male character in 2014 South Korean television series You Are the Only One

See also
List of Korean given names

References

Korean unisex given names